The New Zealand national rugby union team (also known as the All Blacks) has played 37 matches against Wales, winning 34 of them. The first Test match between the two sides was played in 1905 at Cardiff Arms Park, with Wales winning 3–0, when the All Blacks were in Wales during the historic 1905–1906 All Blacks tour in Europe and North America. The loss was said to be controversial, as All Blacks wing Bob Deans claimed to have scored a try that would have brought them level. However, Wales were generally considered the better team with the All Blacks playing particularly poorly in the first half of the game. Two more Welsh victories in the next 50 years were balanced by a defeat by the 1924 All Black "Invincibles". Since the last loss (19 December 1953) New Zealand have won 33 consecutive encounters and Wales winning 0. Wales also played the touring New Zealand Natives team at St Helens on 22 December 1888 defeating them by 1 Goal to nil and the New Zealand Services at Cardiff on 21 April 1919, with Wales losing 6–3. Wales has accorded both of these matches 'test' status but neither game is considered to be an official test by New Zealand. Wales has also played the New Zealand Maori in Cardiff on 13 November 1982 defeating them 25–19. Neither country accorded that game test status.

Summary

Overview

Records
Note: Date shown in brackets indicates when the record was or last set.

Results

List of series

 
New Zealand national rugby union team matches
Wales national rugby union team matches